Gale Wilhelm (April 26, 1908 – July 11, 1991) was an American writer most noted for two books that featured lesbian themes written in the 1930s: We Too Are Drifting and Torchlight to Valhalla.

Early life 
Wilhelm was born April 26, 1908, in Eugene, Oregon, to Ethel Gale Brewer and Wilson Price Wilhelm in 1908. She was the youngest of five children. By age ten, she had moved to Boise, Idaho with her mother and siblings, but seemingly, her father was absent at this time.

In 1921, Wilhelm’s sister closest in age to her, Louise, died. This death may have been what spurred Gale’s move back to Oregon by 1923. Wilhelm completed high school, and spent at least ninth grade at Medford High School in Medford, Oregon.

By 1930, Wilhelm had moved with her family to California. At 21 years old, she lived in Berkeley, CA with her sister, Nina Clark in Clark's family home, along with Nina’s husband and their three children.

Writing career 
Wilhelm published several short stories in 1934 and 1935, her first appearing in Literary America.

Wilhelm's first novel, We Too Are Drifting was published in 1935 by Random House, to many favorable reviews. After the publication, Wilhelm worked as Associate Editor of Literary America, living in New York for one year. She then returned to the Bay Area.

In 1938, Random House published Torchlight to Valhalla, Wilhelm's second lesbian-themed novel in which the protagonist, a young woman, is pursued by a very handsome and charming young man, but realizes her true happiness is with another young woman.

Wilhelm wrote three more novels, Bring Home the Bride in 1940, The Time Between in 1942 and Never Let Me Go in 1945, all with heterosexual themes. Never Let Me Go included praise from Wilhelm's friend Carl Sandburg on the book jacket.

In 1943, Wilhelm received an honorary membership in the International Mark Twain Society for her “outstanding contribution in the field of fiction”.

Wilhelm also published stories in Colliers and Yale Review in the early 1940s, but didn't publish anything new after 1943. However, both Wilhelm's lesbian themed books were reprinted many times in the 1940s, 1950s, and 1960s. Torchlight to Valhalla was given a new name, The Strange Path, with a rather salacious cover in 1953.

In 1975, Torchlight to Valhalla was reprinted by Arno Press's library edition of Homosexuality: Lesbians and Gay Men in Society, History and Literature.

Wilhelm is now lauded for prose imitating, if not on par, with Hemingway’s, as well as her accomplishment in We Too Are Drifting of taking the lesbian narrative away from the root of homosexuality and instead creating a discourse on gendered and sexual dynamics in lesbian relationships that had been scarcely written about at the time.

Personal life
Wilhelm lived with Helen Hope Rudolph Page in Oakdale, California from 1938 until Page's death in 1948. When they first started living together, they lived along with Page’s mother, and Wilhelm is written in the 1940 census as a “friend” of the household. After the death of Page, Wilhelm returned once again to the Bay Area, in Berkeley.

Wilhelm's disappearance from the writing and publishing world coincided with both the death of her father in 1941, and more noticeably, with the death of Helen Page in the late 1940s.

Barbara Grier spent several years attempting to locate Wilhelm. The 1984 Naiad Press edition of We Too Are Drifting included a foreword by Grier describing Wilhelm's life and pleading for any assistance from anyone who knew any information on the whereabouts of Wilhelm. Grier speculated that Wilhelm stopped writing before she turned 40 years old because "the world would not let her write the books she wanted." In 1985, Grier received an anonymous note pointing her to Wilhelm, who was living in Berkeley. She found Wilhelm aged and ill, but delighted that her books were still being read and enjoyed. By the time Naiad Press reprinted Torchlight to Valhalla in 1985, it contained a foreword by Wilhelm herself, an autobiographical sketch.

Wilhelm lived with her partner, Kathleen Huebner, from 1953 until Wilhelm passed away in 1991 of cancer.

Published works
We Too Are Drifting, 1934
No Letters for the Dead, 1936
Torchlight to Valhalla, 1938 (also published in the 1950s as The Strange Path)
Bring Home the Bride, 1940
The Time Between, 1942
Never Let Me Go, 1945

References

External links
Guide to the Gale Wilhelm Papers at The Bancroft Library

1908 births
1991 deaths
American lesbian writers
Writers from Eugene, Oregon
20th-century American women writers
American women novelists
20th-century American novelists
20th-century American LGBT people